Ophlitaspongia papilla is a species of demosponge belonging to the family Microcionidae. It is found along north-eastern Atlantic coastlines. This is a red sponge which forms thin, smooth encrusting patches, up to 5 cm across, with regularly spaced oscula.

Description
It is very thin and flat with a smooth shiny surface. The oscula are well-defined and regularly distributed, each having a small collar with a slightly raised edge. The colour of this sponge is blood red.

Distribution and habitat
Ophlitaspongia papilla occurs in the northeastern Atlantic Ocean, its range extending from the British Isles to the Canary Islands, the Azores and Madeira. It is also known from New Zealand waters. It is occasionally found at slightly greater depths encrusting the shells of bivalve molluscs such as Chlamys opercularis. It tends to be found in areas with high water movement, either from currents or the action of waves, and is usually found under overhangs, on vertical walls, in crevices or on ledges.

Life cycle
Larvae are liberated by Ophlitaspongia papilla over a period of about a month in late summer. These initially swim upwards, rotating as they swim, and remain at the surface. Most later swim downwards and descend to the substrate where they can creep about before metamorphosis takes place some 24 to 36 hours after liberation, but some metamorphose on the surface. Mortality is high in widely-separated individuals but lower when several undergo metamorphosis close together as these individuals subsequently coalesce into fused masses. It is possible that these masses could be formed by larvae from different sponge populations. The result may be equivalent to cross-fertilisation within a common envelope and result in an enlarged gene pool and the efficient production of genetic diversity.

References

Poecilosclerida
Animals described in 1866
Taxa named by James Scott Bowerbank